Austrocidaria is a genus of moths in the family Geometridae. It was described by John S. Dugdale in 1971.

Selected species

 Austrocidaria anguligera (Butler, 1879)
 Austrocidaria arenosa (Howes, 1911)
 Austrocidaria bipartita (Prout, 1958)
 Austrocidaria callichlora (Butler, 1879)
 Austrocidaria cedrinodes (Meyrick, 1911) 
 Austrocidaria erasta (Turner, 1939)
 Austrocidaria gobiata (Felder & Rogenhofer, 1875)
 Austrocidaria haemophaea (Meyrick, 1925)
 Austrocidaria lithurga (Meyrick, 1911)
 Austrocidaria parora (Meyrick, 1884)
 Austrocidaria praerupta (Philpott, 1918)
 Austrocidaria prionota (Meyrick, 1883)
 Austrocidaria similata (Walker 1862)
 Austrocidaria stricta (Philpott, 1915)
 Austrocidaria umbrosa (Philpott, 1917)
 Austrocidaria venustatis (Salmon, 1946)

References

Larentiinae
Geometridae genera